The Bruce–Dowd–Kennedy House is a historic house located at Carthage, Moore County, North Carolina.

Description and history 
It was built about 1850, and is a one-story, five bay by four bay, double-pile Greek Revival style raised cottage. It has a low-pitched, broadly overhanging hip roof and an attached, full width, hip-roofed porch. The house was expanded twice by rear and side additions built at the turn of the 20th century. It has long been considered the oldest standing house in Carthage.

It was added to the National Register of Historic Places on September 29, 1980.

References

Houses on the National Register of Historic Places in North Carolina
Greek Revival houses in North Carolina
Houses completed in 1850
Houses in Moore County, North Carolina
National Register of Historic Places in Moore County, North Carolina